Demets may refer to :

Fernand Demets (Sint-Gillis, 8 March 1884 - Brussels, 29 September 1952) was a Belgian liberal politician.
Stéphane Demets (born 26 December 1976 in Brussels) is a Belgian football defender.